The 1916–17 Toronto Hockey Club season was the fifth and final season of the Toronto franchise in the National Hockey Association (NHA). With the departure of the Toronto 228th Battalion when their regiment was ordered overseas, the NHA decided to suspend the Toronto Blueshirts franchise as well for the remainder of the season.  Before the start of the next season, the NHA folded and a new league, the National Hockey League (NHL), was founded with a new team, the Toronto Hockey Club, which went on to become the present day Toronto Maple Leafs.

Regular season

Final standings

Game log

First half

Second half

 Toronto Blueshirts franchise suspended on February 11.

See also
 1916–17 NHA season

References

Toronto Blueshirts seasons
Toronto
Toronto